Theoharis is a surname. Notable people with the surname include:

Amber Theoharis (born 1978), American television host
Athan Theoharis (1936–2021), American historian
Jeanne Theoharis, American political scientist
Liz Theoharis (born 1976), American Presbyterian minister and activist